Originating in India in 1999, Lifestyle is an Emirati retail fashion brand which comes under Dubai-based retail and hospitality conglomerate, the Landmark Group.

Lifestyle's inventory consists of several national and international brands. Its product categories include Indian and western apparels, footwear, handbags, beauty products, and fashion accessories for men, women, and children.

In India, Lifestyle Stores is a part of Lifestyle International Pvt. Ltd, with sister brands Home Centre, Max, and Easybuy.

Lifestyle International Pvt. Ltd has witnessed a compounded annual growth rate of 25% over the last three years, and has been ranked 10th on the list of Best Companies to Work for in 2015.

Overview
Lifestyle opened its first store in Chennai, Tamil Nadu, India in 1999. Each Lifestyle store offers womenswear, menswear, kidswear, footwear, bags, beauty, skincare & accessories such as (watches, fragrances, sunglasses) & many more.

Lifestyle International Pvt. Ltd is led by Shital Mehta, who is the managing director of the company.

Landmark Group's business in India, which started with the Lifestyle stores, has now expanded to include Home Centre, Max, and Easybuy. The Group's foray into e-commerce in India began in January 2016 with Landmarkshops.in, which was replaced by three separate brand sites and apps for Lifestyle, Home Centre and Max in January 2017.

Company growth 
Lifestyle International Pvt. Ltd. saw a growth of about 24% in the fiscal year 2016 to cross the ₹7,000 crore mark.

Retail stores by Lifestyle 

The Lifestyle stores have a multi-level store format, which is normally spread over two or three floors that provides a square line-of-sight, allowing customers to view the product sections in a single glance.

The company sells national and international brands, which make up 75% of their stock, along with its in-house brand labels that bring in about 30% of the revenues and account for the remaining 25% of in-store stock. Lifestyle's private labels include brands like Melange, which is a ₹150 crore brand with eight stores in India.

Lifestyle International generates the majority of its revenue through its brick-and-mortar stores, which consist of 63 Lifestyle stores. The retail chain is already established in 1 tier cities, and plans to develop stores in 2/3-tier cities such as Nagpur, Jaipur and recently, Visakhapatnam and Nashik. Each store is estimated to cost the company around Rs. 10 crore to set up, on an average.

Latest store openings 
Lifestyle's 55th store was opened on 6 September 2016, at Bangalore's Phoenix Marketcity, Whitefield. It was inaugurated by Bollywood actor and Melange's brand ambassador, Kangana Ranaut. In addition to that, another store was inaugurated at the Waltair Uplands in Vishakhapatnam by actor Rana Daggubati on 24 March 2017.

Employee welfare initiatives 
In wake of a high employee attrition rate in 2015, the company decided to offer flexible working hours and to provide medical facilities to its front-end staff, among other benefits. With that, the company has managed to reduce the attrition rate to 35% in 2017, from 80% in 2005, while the industry average is still 50%.

Employee welfare initiates called 'LIFE 'and 'LEAP' were run by the company. LIFE standing for Learn – Implement – Fastrack – Expert and LEAP for Landmark Education are two in-house programs that provide technical and soft skills to the front-end employees and enables them to get a degree in retail management, respectively.

The company also held employee appreciation programs such as the Clash of Icons, Make a difference; Incentives and Long Service awards are given periodically to deserving employees. Corporate Theatre was another informal learning technique used by Lifestyle to educate, entertain and engage its employees.

Corporate social responsibility 
Spreading awareness about diabetes, Landmark Group has held multiple editions of the 'Beat Diabetes’ campaign that involves setting up free glucose screening test counters at Lifestyle and other stores under the brand. The sixth and latest edition of the campaign was held in November 2015 and had athlete Anju Bobby George and film actresses Amulya and Samyukta Hornad join in.

Home Centre Stores 
Home Centre is a part of the Lifestyle chain of stores in India.

Home Centre by Lifestyle sells furniture, furnishings and home decorative. The brand has been awarded as the Most Admired Retailer award in the Home & Office Improvement Category, for two consecutive years – 2008 and 2009.

See also 
 List of department stores by country

References

External links 
 http://www.lifestylestores.com
 https://stores.lifestylestores.com/

Companies based in Bangalore
Retail companies established in 1999
Department stores of India
Clothing retailers of India
Indian companies established in 1999